Paul Bock (July 29, 1890 – March 23, 1968) was a German politician of the Christian Democratic Union (CDU) and former member of the German Bundestag.

Life 
He was one of the founders of the CDU in Lübeck in 1945. Bock was a member of the Lübeck citizenship in 1946/47 and 1950/51. He was a member of the German Bundestag from 1953 to 1957. In parliament he represented the constituency of Lübeck.

Literature

References

1890 births
1968 deaths
Members of the Bundestag for Schleswig-Holstein
Members of the Bundestag 1953–1957
Members of the Bundestag for the Christian Democratic Union of Germany